Famílias Frente a Frente (English: Families Face to Face, abbreviated as FFF) is a Brazilian  cooking reality competition television series based on the Australian television series ''Family Food Fight.

The series is produced by Endemol Shine Brasil and aired by SBT. It was first released on Thursday, October 10, 2019 on Amazon Prime Video, premiering on SBT the following day, on Friday, October 11 at 11:15 p.m. (BRT / AMT).

Diverse and multi-generational Brazilian families go head-to-head in high-pressure cooking challenges inspired by real home cooking and family food traditions to win an ultimate prize of R$100.000.

Contestants
Source:
(ages stated at time of contest)

Elimination chart

Key

Ratings and reception

Brazilian ratings
All numbers are in points and provided by Kantar Ibope Media.

References

External links
 Famílias Frente a Frente on SBT

2019 Brazilian television series debuts
2019 Brazilian television series endings
2019 Brazilian television seasons
Brazilian reality television series
Portuguese-language television shows